Reidar Thoralf Larsen (8 October 1923 – 16 February 2012) was a Norwegian politician. He was chairman of the Communist Party of Norway from 1965 to 1975, when he resigned from his position, left the party and joined the Socialist Left Party (SV). He left SV in 1999 in protest against the party's support for the NATO bombing of Yugoslavia, and because he felt the party was not radical enough.

Larsen was a member of the Parliament of Norway from 1973 to 1977, representing Hedmark.

References

1923 births
2012 deaths
Politicians from Lillehammer
Members of the Storting
Communist Party of Norway politicians
Socialist Left Party (Norway) politicians
Hedmark politicians
Norwegian memoirists
20th-century Norwegian politicians